Pedro Rosa Nales (born December 3, 1956 in Fajardo, Puerto Rico) is a Puerto Rican journalist, news anchor and a recognized martial artist.  As a journalist he has received over 20 awards.

Journalism
He started working at radio station WMDD in Fajardo. As a television journalist, he was recruited by the WAPA-TV channel 4 of San Juan, Puerto Rico in 1981, becoming the first black Puerto Rican to work as a TV reporter. During his 32 years as a TV journalist, he had won more than 100 awards from several organizations in Puerto Rico and the United States, including awards for the coverage of hurricanes and investigative reports like Red Alert 1 and 2, in which he uncovered the military use of the Vieques island and the effects of army maneuvers on the population.

In the past years, he has worked as a host (Anchor) on various editions of Noticentro 4 on WAPA TV and in 2014 on "Noticentro America" for viewers in the United States. In 2017, he anchored the 5 p.m. news hour for Noticentro. In 2018,  (Noticentro In the Morning) celebrated  eighteen years on air.

Rosa Nales sued WAPA-TV during December 2020 for the amount of $2.5 million dollars, alleging he was ignored in favor of White colleagues when the network decided to install Rafael Lenin Lopez as main afternoon news reporter instead of him due to Rosa Nales' being Black and also an older person than Lenin Lopez.

Martial arts
When memes of Rosa Nales, in martial arts poses, were discovered on the net, he gladly shared with the public that he has practiced martial arts all his life, for over 47 years.

Personal life
He served in the United States Army as a parachutist from the 82nd Airborne Division, in the 7th Special Forces Group (Airborne) and the 101st Airborne Division (Air Assault). He was later Press officer, Executive officer, Radio and Tv officer and Unit commander in the Puerto Rico National Guard with the rank of captain.

Rosa Nales married young, and his wife had a daughter when he was just seventeen years old. They divorced while he was in the army.

On June 29, 2021, Pedro Rosa Nales' sixteen year-old grandson was accused of murder, along with another teenager.

References

1956 births
Living people
People from Fajardo, Puerto Rico
Puerto Rican journalists
Puerto Rican news anchors
Puerto Rico National Guard personnel
United States Army officers